
The Apollo Affair was a 1965 incident in which a US company, Nuclear Materials and Equipment Corporation (NUMEC), in the Pittsburgh suburbs of Apollo and Parks Township, Pennsylvania was investigated for losing  of highly enriched uranium, with suspicions that it had gone to Israel's nuclear weapons program.

History
Shapiro was a long-time Zionist, and he had business interests and contacts among high government officials in Israel, including a contract to build nuclear-powered generators for Israel. The Atomic Energy Commission, the Central Intelligence Agency (CIA), other government agencies, and inquiring reporters conducted similar investigations, and no charges were ever filed. A General Accounting Office study of the investigations declassified in May 2010 stated "We believe a timely, concerted effort on the part of these three agencies would have greatly aided and possibly solved the NUMEC diversion questions, if they desired to do so."

In February 1976 the CIA briefed senior staff at the Nuclear Regulatory Commission (NRC) about the matter, stating that the CIA believed the missing highly enriched uranium went to Israel. The NRC informed the White House, leading to President-elect Carter being briefed about the investigation. Carter asked for an assessment by his National Security Advisor, whose staff concluded "The CIA case is persuasive, though not conclusive."

Some remain convinced that Israel received  or more of highly enriched uranium from NUMEC, particularly given the visit of Rafi Eitan, later revealed as an Israeli spy and who was later involved in the Jonathan Pollard incident. In June 1986, analyst Anthony Cordesman told United Press International:

There is no conceivable reason for Eitan to have gone [to the Apollo plant] but for the nuclear material.”

In his 1991 book, The Samson Option, Seymour Hersh concluded that Shapiro did not divert any uranium; rather "it ended up in the air and water of the city of Apollo as well as in the ducts, tubes, and floors of the NUMEC plant." He also wrote that Shapiro's meetings with senior Israeli officials in his home were related to protecting the water supply in Israel rather than any diversion of nuclear material or information.

A later investigation was conducted by the Nuclear Regulatory Commission (successor to the AEC) regarding an additional  of uranium that was found to be missing between 1974 and 1976, after the plant had been purchased by Babcock & Wilcox and Shapiro was no longer associated with the company. Hersh further quoted one of the main investigators, Carl Duckett, as saying "I know of nothing at all to indicate that Shapiro was guilty."

In 1993, Glenn T. Seaborg, former head of the Atomic Energy Commission wrote a book, The Atomic Energy Commission under Nixon, Adjusting to Troubled Times which devoted a chapter to Shapiro and NUMEC, the last sentence of which states:

Distinguished as Shapiro's career has been, one cannot but wonder whether it might not have been even more illustrious had these unjust charges not been leveled against him.

Later U.S. Department of Energy records show that NUMEC had the largest highly enriched uranium inventory loss of all U.S. commercial sites, with a  inventory loss before 1968, and  thereafter.

At the prompting of Zalman Shapiro's lawyer, senator Arlen Specter asked the Nuclear Regulatory Commission (NRC) to clear him of any suspicion of diversion in August 2009. The NRC refused, stating:

NRC found no documents that provided specific evidence that the diversion of nuclear materials occurred. However, consistent with previous Commission statements, NRC does not have information that would allow it to unequivocally conclude that nuclear material was not diverted from the site, nor that all previously unaccounted for material was accounted for during the decommissioning of the site.

In 2014, further documents about the investigation were declassified, though still heavily redacted.

The U.S. Army Corps of Engineers is overseeing a cleanup of contaminated land at the site of NUMEC's waste disposal. The project was scheduled to be completed in 2015, but the discovery of a substantially larger amount of contamination resulted in a seven year delay. Excavation is now scheduled to begin in 2021, with an estimated project time of 10 years.

In popular culture
Dominique LaPierre and Larry Collins mentioned this incident as part of a lengthy and detailed backstory to Israel's nuclear arsenal and its aborted nuclear strike against Libya in The Fifth Horseman. The film states that at least half of the uranium, according to the CIA, made it to Israel.

In the movie The Sum of All Fears, after determining that the Baltimore nuclear bomb's plutonium came from Savannah River in 1968, Jack Ryan asked Spinnaker via smartphone where the plutonium went. This is a fictitious reference to the Apollo Affair. In the movie an Israeli A-4 carrying a plutonium bomb is shot down, its bomb later recovered by scrap dealers, and its plutonium sold to neo-Nazis (Palestinian terrorists in the book).

See also

Israel and weapons of mass destruction
Nuclear technology

Further reading
 Stealing the Atom Bomb: How Denial and Deception Armed Israel by Roger Mattson (2016)
”The NUMEC Affair: Did Highly Enriched Uranium from the U.S. Aid Israel’s Nuclear Weapons Program? National Security Archive Electronic Briefing Book No. 565, Posted - November 2, 2016

References

External links
 FBI file on NUMEC
 NUMEC made significant advancements, Thomas, Mary Ann and Santanam, Ramesh. 2002-08-28. Valley News Dispatch
 Government agencies investigated missing uranium, NUMEC, Thomas, Mary Ann and Santanam, Ramesh. 2002-08-25. Valley News Dispatch
 The Third Temple's Holy Of Holies: Israel's Nuclear Weapons, Warner D. Farr, USAF Counterproliferation Center, Maxwell Air Force Base, September 1999

Israeli nuclear development
Nuclear history of the United States
Israel–United States relations
1965 in the United States